Like all municipalities of Puerto Rico, Ceiba is subdivided into administrative units called barrios, which are roughly comparable to minor civil divisions The barrios and subbarrios, in turn, are further subdivided into smaller local populated place areas/units called sectores (sectors in English). The types of sectores may vary, from normally sector to urbanización to reparto to barriada to residencial, among others. Some sectors appear in two barrios.

List of sectors by barrio

Ceiba barrio-pueblo
Apartamentos Portal de Ceiba
Condominio Costa Esmeralda
Condominio Paseo Esmeralda
Égida Francisco Colón Gordiani
Residencia Solares Ávila
Residencial Jardines de Ceiba
Sector Colonia Santa María
Urbanización Celina
Urbanización Costa Brava
Urbanización Jardines Ávila
Urbanización Jardines de Ceiba I y II
Urbanización Paseo de la Costa
Urbanización Puerta del Sol
Urbanización Ramos Antonini
Urbanización Rossy Valley
Urbanización Santa María
Urbanización Villa Flores

Chupacallos

Parcelas Aguas Claras
Sector El Corcho
Sector El Panal
Sector Las Quintas
Sector Silén
Urbanización Mansiones Vista de Mar

Daguao
Sector Los Millones

Guayacán Sectors
There are no sectors in Guayacán barrio.

Machos
Condominio Brisas Court
Condominio Castillos del Mar
Edificio Félix Ríos López
Edificio Mundo Plaza
Extensión Villas del Pilar
Parcelas Machos
Residencial La Seyba
Sector Cielito
Sector Mansiones de Brisas
Sector Polo Norte
Sector Punta Figueras
Urbanización Brisas de Ceiba
Urbanización Paseo de Ceiba
Urbanización River Valley
Urbanización Valle de Ceiba
Urbanización Vegas de Ceiba
Urbanización The Village at the Hill
Urbanización Villas del Pilar

Quebrada Seca
Barrio Daguao Abajo
Barrio Daguao Arriba
Edificio Bundy (Bundy Apartment)
Parcelas Nuevas de Quebrada Seca
Sector El Sol (Calle El Sol)
Sector Estancia Prado Hermoso,
Sector La Luna (Calle Luna)
Urbanización Roosevelt Gardens

Río Abajo
Camino Charco Frío
Sector La Paloma
Sector Rincón
Sector Sonadora

Saco
Parcelas Calderona
Sector Aguacate
Sector El Mangó
Sector Las Quintas

See also

 List of communities in Puerto Rico

References

Ceiba
Ceiba